"The Ghost of Harrenhal" is the fifth episode of the second season of HBO's medieval fantasy television series Game of Thrones. It was written by series co-creators David Benioff and D. B. Weiss and directed by David Petrarca, his second episode this season. It premiered on April 29, 2012.

“The Ghost of Harrenhal” is how Arya Stark describes herself while at Harrenhal in A Clash of Kings, the novel on which the season is based, although the phrase is not heard in the episode.

This episode marks the final appearance of Gethin Anthony (Renly Baratheon).

Plot

In the Stormlands
As Renly and Catelyn negotiate an alliance, Melisandre's shadow creature kills Renly and disappears. Brienne, mistaken for the murderer, is forced to slay Renly's guards and escape with Catelyn. Brienne and Catelyn stop beside a river to discuss her return to Winterfell and Renly's death. Brienne swears allegiance to Catelyn, who promises not to interfere with Brienne's vengeance against Stannis.

Loras also blames Stannis, but Littlefinger and Margaery convince him to flee. Stannis arrives, and his dead brother's bannermen swear fealty to him. Following Davos' advice, Melisandre's blood magic is not used for the King's Landing assault; Stannis gives a reluctant Davos command of the fleet.

In King's Landing
Tyrion learns from Lancel that Cersei is stockpiling King Aerys's dangerously flammable "wildfire", and visits the royal pyromancer, Wisdom Hallyne, who reveals a massive cache of wildfire Joffrey intends to catapult at Stannis' forces. Bronn doubts the logistics and odds of Joffrey's idea, so Tyrion claims the cache for his own plan.

In Qarth
Daenerys holds court at Qarth as her dragons grow. The warlock Pyat Pree invites Daenerys to visit the "House of the Undying", while the masked Quaithe warns Ser Jorah of dangers facing Daenerys. Xaro asks to marry Daenerys in exchange for resources to take King's Landing. Jorah argues that Daenerys must win the Iron Throne on her own, and she eventually agrees.

Beyond The Wall
The Night's Watch meet legendary ranger Qhorin Halfhand at the Fist of the First Men, an ancient fortification. Qhorin warns that the wildlings have become more organized and dangerous under former ranger Mance Rayder. Jon volunteers to join Qhorin in eliminating a wildling watchpost.

At Winterfell
Receiving news that Torrhen's Square is under attack, Bran urges Ser Rodrik to raise defenders. He tells Osha of his dreams featuring a "three-eyed raven" but she deflects his inquiries.

On The Iron Islands
Despite Theon's lineage and title, his new ship's crew have little respect for him. Yara comes to make jokes at him. First mate Dagmer Cleftjaw explains Theon must win their respect. When Dagmer proposes assaulting the Northern town of Torrhen's Square, Theon realizes that will leave Winterfell poorly defended for a takeover.

At Harrenhal
Tywin holds council to discuss Robb Stark.Tywin deduces Arya is a Northerner, but remains unaware of her true identity. Jaqen H'ghar, disguised as a Lannister guardsman, offers Arya "three lives" in return for saving him and two others from their burning caravan cell. She designates "The Tickler", Harrenhal's cruel interrogator, as her first victim. He is found dead, and Jaqen signals to Arya that the first life debt has been paid, leaving Arya pleased.

Production

Writing

"The Ghost of Harrenhal" is the fifth episode of the second season written by the two showrunners David Benioff and D.B. Weiss, and the fifteenth in the whole series. The script is based on the chapters Daenerys II, Arya VII, Catelyn IV, Jon IV, Bran V, Catelyn V, and Jon V (28, 31, 34, 35, 36, 40, and 44) from George R. R. Martin's A Clash of Kings. Tyrion's scenes with the Pyromancers and Cersei are taken from the chapters Tyrion V and Tyrion VIII (21 and 37).

There are numerous divergences from the source material: in the books Lord Baelish is sent by the Council to negotiate with the Tyrells only after Renly is dead; Theon's departure from Pyke is not shown, and Dagmer Cleftjaw is a scarred old master-at-arms who is fond of Theon because Cleftjaw trained him when Theon was a boy; Arya is a scullion instead of a cupbearer and is not able to interact with Lord Tywin; and the character of Xaro Xhoan Daxos has been drastically changed making him a black heterosexual of humble origins and giving him a vault that is never mentioned in the books.

Casting
The episode introduces the character of the pyromancer "Wisdom" Hallyne, played by the British actor Roy Dotrice. Dotrice is a personal friend of George R. R. Martin, since the two met while working on the 1980s hit TV series, Beauty and the Beast (Martin as a producer, and Dotrice playing "Father"). Years later, Dotrice was Martin's choice to read the audiobooks of A Song of Ice and Fire, a work that brought Dotrice a Guinness World Record for the largest number of characters voiced in an audiobook.

After the series was greenlighted, Martin wanted to involve Dotrice, suggesting Maester Aemon, Rodrik Cassel or Grand Maester Pycelle as possible roles. He was eventually cast as Pycelle, but he had to withdraw from the show for medical reasons and Julian Glover was cast to replace him. In the second season, with his health recovered, he was given the role of Hallyne.

Other characters introduced in the episode are the Night's Watch ranger Qhorin Halfhand, played by Simon Armstrong, and the mysterious Quaithe, played by the German actress Laura Pradelska. This is also the first episode in which Pyat Pree (briefly seen standing in Episode 4) has any lines.

Filming locations
The episode's interior shots were filmed at The Paint Hall studios, close to Belfast, where the main sets are located. Also in Northern Ireland were filmed the scenes at Harrenhal (in a set built near Banbridge) and Pyke (at the port of Ballintoy). Renly's camp was once again filmed on the country's northern coast.

After having filmed the Night's Watch storyline beyond the Wall in Northern Irish forests for the first four episodes of the season, the producers decided that the unexplored land further to the north would be filmed in Iceland. According to the creator George R. R. Martin's vision of the setting, "the area closest to my Wall is densely forested (...). And then as you get further and further north, it changes. You get into tundra and ice fields and it becomes more of an arctic environment. You have plains on one side and a very high range of mountains on the other."

Co-Producer Chris Newman said that until then they had been able to reproduce the lands north of the Wall by adding artificial snow, but now they needed a bigger landscape. According to David Benioff, they always "wanted something shatteringly beautiful and barren and brutal for this part of Jon's journey, because he's in the true North now."

To represent the Frostfangs and The Fist of the First Men, the production filmed at the glacier at Snæfellsjökull, and also at the glacier of Svínafellsjökull in Smyrlabjörg and the hills of Höfðabrekkuheiði (near Vík).

The other main location introduced in the episode was the gardens of Qarth, which were filmed at the Benedictine monastery of the Croatian island of Lokrum. The abandoned monastery was built in Gothic-Renaissance style in the 15th century.

The island of Lokrum is only 680 metres offshore from Dubrovnik, the location used for King Landing's exteriors, and can be reached by boat in 15 minutes. Coincidentally, Lokrum shares with its fictional counterpart of Qarth having peacocks among its distinctive features: Lokrum is inhabited by families of peacocks that were introduced to the island in the 19th century by the Austrian archduke Maximilian.

Reception

Ratings
The first airing of the episode obtained 3.903 million viewers, which represented the series high to date, and a 1.9 in the 18-49 demographic. The encore airing brought an additional 0.8 million for a total of 4.7 million. In the United Kingdom, the episode was seen by 0.851 million viewers on Sky Atlantic, being the channel's highest-rated broadcast that week.

Critical reception
"The Ghost of Harrenhal" received generally positive reviews. Review aggregator Rotten Tomatoes surveyed 12 reviews and judged 92% of them to be positive with an average score of 8.6 out of 10. The website's critical consensus reads, "'The Ghost of Harrenhal' utilizes some unexpected character pairings to explore GOT's shifting power structure and build momentum leading into the second half of the season." James Hibberd from Entertainment Weekly found it "one of the strongest season two episodes yet," Jace Lacob from Televisionary considered it "sensational," and Matt Richental from TV fanatic called it "another enjoyable, complex, involved Game of Thrones episode." IGNs Matt Fowler gave the episode an 8.5 out of 10, and at The A.V. Club David Sims gave it an A− and Emily VanDerWerff rated it B+.

One of VanDerWerff's criticisms of the episode is that it was too cluttered for her, treating important moments such as Renly's death in a matter of moments and moving away fast to the next thing. In her opinion this was because this was the first episode of the season to incorporate all the locations instead of omitting one or two. Elio Garcia of Westeros.org shared this view, saying that while many individual scenes were very good he missed a strong narrative thread connecting the multiple storylines.

Renly's death received many criticisms: David Sims wrote that Renly's death "came out of nowhere," Emily VanderWerff found it too rushed, and Elio Garcia said that due to director David Petrarca's mediocre direction choices, the effect of what should have been one of the most shocking scenes of the season was ruined. Garcia extended his harsh criticism to the scene depicting the aftermath of Renly's death and specially the decision to portray Loras' reaction to the murder of his lover with a contained grief instead of the book's homicidal rage.

On the other hand, the exchange between Arya and Tywin was unanimously praised, both in terms of acting and direction. Writing for The Huffington Post, Maureen Ryan commended Maisie Williams for being able to hold her own in a scene with the charismatic Charles Dance. Another scene that was usually highlighted was Brienne's pledge of fealty to Catelyn Stark. Lacob described Christie's acting superlative, rendering a tragic air to Brienne, while VanDerWerff noted how Fairley's subtle performance with just a hint of tears and wavering voice made the scene almost a perfect one.

Other aspects that were praised by the reviewers were the production choice of filming in Iceland due to the magnificence and beauty of the shots, and good work done by the CGI team in making the dragon look like a real animal. Also, the reviewer Myles McNutt who coined the term "sexposition" to describe the use of sex in the show, noted that this was the first episode that did not feature nudity.

In his ranking of the episodes of the series, Adam B. Vary of BuzzFeed criticized the episode, placing it at number 47 and citing "tedious setup" for his reasoning. Patrick Koch of WhatCulture was less critical, though he conceded that "the episode is pretty bare in terms of plot developments."

Awards and nominations

References

External links

 "The Ghost of Harrenhal" at HBO.com
 

2012 American television episodes
Game of Thrones (season 2) episodes
Fratricide in fiction
Fiction about regicide
Television episodes about demons
Television episodes written by David Benioff and D. B. Weiss